Meiothrips is a genus of thrips in the family Phlaeothripidae.

Species
 Meiothrips annulipes
 Meiothrips fuscicrus
 Meiothrips kurosawai
 Meiothrips menoni
 Meiothrips nepalensis

References

Phlaeothripidae
Thrips
Thrips genera